Chuck Carey is a retired American soccer defender who played professionally in the North American Soccer League.

Youth
Carey attended California State University, Chico where he played on the men's soccer team from 1971 to 1974.  He earned his bachelor's degree in religious studies in 1975.  In 1980, he returned to earn master's degree in physical education.  In 2002, the university inducted Carey into the Athletic Hall of Fame.

Professional
In 1975, Carey signed with the San Jose Earthquakes of the North American Soccer League.  The Earthquakes sent him to the San Antonio Thunder during the season.  In 1976, the Thunder sent Carey to the Portland Timbers.  On January 10, 1977, the Timbers sent him to the Washington Diplomats.  Three days later, the Diplomats traded Carey, Charlie McCully and its 1978 first round draft pick to the San Antonio Thunder in exchange for Thunder's first round draft pick and Tom Galati.  However, the Thunder moved to Hawaii soon after to become Team Hawaii and Carey did not make the move with the team.  In 1978, he signed with the Detroit Express and spent two seasons with them.

References

External links
 NASL stats

1953 births
Living people
People from Bethesda, Maryland
Soccer players from Maryland
American soccer players
Detroit Express players
North American Soccer League (1968–1984) players
Portland Timbers (1975–1982) players
San Antonio Thunder players
San Jose Earthquakes (1974–1988) players
SIU Edwardsville Cougars men's soccer players
Association football defenders